Verquigneul is a commune in the Pas-de-Calais Departments of France in the Hauts-de-France region of France.

Population

See also
Communes of the Pas-de-Calais department

References

Communes of Pas-de-Calais